(English: "Pichilemu School of the Precious Blood"), often shortened to , is a coeducational Roman Catholic private state-subsidized day school, serving students in preschool (Chile's ) through twelfth grade, located in the commune of Pichilemu, Libertador General Bernardo O'Higgins Region, Chile.

The school has been fully coeducational since March 1979, and was renamed to its current name in 1986. Cardenal Caro Province newspaper  declared  to be "the best school in Pichilemu" based on the results of 2011 standardized tests, while O'Higgins Region newspaper  called the school "a regional icon". It is the largest school in Pichilemu, with 534 students in the 2015 school year.

The school offers students several extracurricular activities, in the sports, religious and humanistic areas. Cheer C.P.S., 's cheerleading squad, has won several national competitions, and has also participated in two international ones. The school's English debate team, informally called Kick-Ass, reached second position in a regional competition in 2011.

History

After the commune of Pichilemu was officially created in 1891, Agustín Ross Edwards, a wealthy Chilean writer, member of parliament, government minister and politician, wanted to turn the town into "a touristic place, an elite resort, collecting the most important characteristics of European places, which would make it unique." For this purpose, he constructed a hotel, a post office, a park, among other structures and buildings, which attracted wealthy families from Chile and Argentina. One of those families was that of Maria Luisa Lira Errázuriz, widow of Wenceslao Díaz Gallegos, a well-known physician; Lira, with her ten children, came from her  estate near San Fernando, and stayed at Ross' facilities in Pichilemu in several occasions.

As years passed, Lira's family decided to visit other beach resorts; however, one of Lira's children, Eugenio, decided to continue visiting Pichilemu, and after he completed his medicine studies in 1904, he constructed a summer house near the center of the town. Eugenio Díaz Lira had a close relationship with several Catholic presbyters and bishops, whom he invited to his summer residence. During his summer stays in Pichilemu, Díaz Lira also created the first medical center in the town called . However, he fell ill, and died on 12 June 1945 in Santiago, at age 65.

After his death, Díaz Lira's wife and his daughters decided to donate his summer residence to the Chilean Congregation of the Precious Blood of Our Lord Jesus Christ. The school's main goal was to "educate girls in Catholic values," with the "necessary training for their insertion in the society as Christian mothers and workers with a solid Human Christian formation." The school's first principal was Mother María Teresa Corvalán Guzmán.

The school was recognized by the Ministry of Education of Chile by Decree 12,946, on 31 December 1954. It became a coeducational school in March 1979. The school was authorized to dictate secondary education classes on 30 January 1995, and started doing so that same year, with the first class graduating in 1998.

In 2012, Governor of Cardenal Caro Province Julio Ibarra Maldonado announced the Colegio de la Preciosa Sangre, in addition to several other high schools in the province, would host professional institute IPG, which would let at least 300 people from Pichilemu obtain a technical degree. Also during that year, the school's oldest building, which hosted the preschool classes, was demolished because of the damage it suffered from the 2010 Chile earthquake, and was re-constructed; the new building was inaugurated on 10 September 2012.

Academics

As of 2012, 's class schedule varies with the student grade level, up to a maximum of  08:00 to 18:00 with ten periods for high school students. Students are not allowed to leave the school during school hours.  aims to give students "integral development, academic excellence", with emphasis in religious values. The school has a Catholic religious orientation.

From the 2,945 high schools in Chile with students taking the PSU test,  ranked 1328th nationally in 2009. It rose to the 849th position in 2010, and in 2011 it placed 738th.

The tests include reading, mathematics, history and social sciences, natural sciences, and English language.

Test scores

Students and faculty

In the 2015 school year, the  had an enrollment of 534 students from preschool (pre-kínder) to twelfth grade with an average of 38 per grade. The school serves students aged between 4 and 19 years old. In 2012, 159 students were classified as "prioritary" under the SEP law (Preferential Scholar Subsidy Law in English); "prioritary students" under the SEP law are those whose "homes' socioeconomic status decreases their chance to participate in the educational process." In 2012, 's faculty had 30 full-time teachers. By 2014, the faculty had 29 workers.

Admission begins each 1 November and ends on 9 December. Most people apply for entering the preschool (pre-kinder) class, which has a maximum of 35 students. Preference is given to siblings or brothers of current or former  Sangre students. Applicants must be at least four years old, but in exceptional cases, students not meeting the prescribed age may take a test to be admitted. No payment is required for enrollment.

 is governed by the Chilean Congregation of the Precious Blood of Our Lord Jesus Christ. The school's principal was, between 2006 and September 2012, Mother Loreto Fuentes Parra. Mother Loreto was also the school's director in the 1980s; in 1987, she was named by the Colegio Provincial de Profesores Cardenal Caro one of the best teachers in Cardenal Caro Province, in a ceremony held at the school's hall. Since 2013, Preciosa Sangre's principal is Mother Elizabeth Carmen Arriagada Sanzana. The Pedagogical Technical Unit (UTP) is directed since 2011 by teacher Graciela Vargas Urzúa. The school has an administrative staff of 45 people.

The students' center of the Colegio de la Preciosa Sangre describes itself as a "representation instance for the school's students, acting in different roles." Students' centers are student organizations, whose members (president, vice president, secretary, among others) are elected democratically by their peers.

Activities
There are numerous extracurricular activities available to  students. Excluding those from the sports area, the activities include choir, instrumental, dancing, scientific,  musical drama, handicrafts, folkloric dance (cueca), pastoral, catechesis, language, and mathematics workshops.

Athletics

As of 2012,  offers seven workshops related to sports. 's athletic club also has hosted tournaments, including , a cheerleading competition which, in 2007, had fifteen participating teams. The club has also organized events such as the first family marathon in Cardenal Caro Province in 2011.

The girls volleyball team placed second in the provincial league, in 2009.

In the Primary Students (Men) category, Felipe Sierra and Washington Saldías placed second and third, respectively. The competition was organized by the Commerce Chambers of Navidad and Pichilemu.

Cheer C.P.S.

In 2009, it consisted of 27 students. The team has won several national competitions, two of them making them eligible to participate in competitions held in the United States of America.

2009 US trip
In 2009, Cheer C.P.S. was the only Chilean team to participate in the JAMfest Nationals international tournament in Tampa, USA, reaching the first place in the Senior All-Music category, and fifth in the Grand Champion category, out of more than 150 teams from several countries. Diario VI Región reported Cheer C.P.S. reached the first place of an international team, and fifth overall. The team could participate in the US competition after winning a tournament held in Viña del Mar in 2008.

According to a report by former councilor of Pichilemu Washington Saldías on online newspaper Pichilemu News, there were massive celebrations after a local radio reported the team's achievement. Upon their arrival at Chile, the squad was received at the Palace of La Moneda by Government General Secretary Minister Carolina Tohá, mayor of Pichilemu Roberto Córdova, and Members of the Parliament, before coming back to Pichilemu, on 22 April 2009. Their return to Pichilemu was described by Diario VI Región newspaper as "historic", by saying "at Pichilemu, a historical reception was being prepared, as a multitude of people crowded the streets and avenues at the beach resort, waiting for them, in a journey that ended at Colegio Preciosa Sangre in that city."

2013 US trip
In 2013, Cheer C.P.S. participated in two international tournaments after winning a national tournament in 2012: All Star USA 2013 and JAMfest Bash Series, both held in Orlando, Florida, United States. The team, composed of 28 teenagers —most of them Preciosa Sangre students— and their teacher Claudio Rojas, collected funds to travel to the United States by participating in several national tournaments and with the help of the municipality of Pichilemu and the O'Higgins Region government. In the All Star USA 2013 competition, held on 30 March 2013, Cheer C.P.S. made it to the second place, only surpassed by an unspecified Russian team, and cheerleader Noemí Pavez obtained the first place in the Jumping category. In the second competition, Jamfest Nationals (Jam-Bash Series Orlando), held on 6 April 2013, they obtained the first place in the Senior (Co-Ed) Cheer, Best Choreography category. After taking knowledge of the news of their accomplishment, Governor of Cardenal Caro Province Julio Ibarra Maldonado said that "Pichilemu is celebrating [their triumph]," something which was also reported by the local media. Upon their arrival in Chile on 9 April, they were received by President Sebastián Piñera at the Palace of La Moneda in Santiago, along with the Governor of Cardenal Caro, and Mayor of Pichilemu Roberto Córdova. The team's achievement was described by news program 24 Horas of state channel Televisión Nacional de Chile as "coming from a distant beach resort in the region of O'Higgins to conquer North American lands."

CheerPichilemu championship
The cheerleading squad has also organized the CheerPichilemu tournament, hosted for the first time on 29 September 2007 at the Municipal Stadium of Pichilemu (Estadio Municipal de Pichilemu). According to Pichilemu News, CheerPichilemu was "the first national open cheerleading tournament." There were four categories in the first edition: Senior Women, Senior Co-Ed, Open Women, Open Co-Ed, and Couples. The competition was supported by the Tourism Chamber of Pichilemu, the local government, and several other institutions and individuals.

English debate team

The English debate team, informally called Kick-Ass, is led by English teacher Natalia Polanco Pino. The team participated for the first time in the National English Debates Tournament organized by the English Opens Doors program from the Chilean Ministry of Education in 2011, and made it to the regional finals, reaching the second place, losing against the San Fernando College team from San Fernando, discussing the topic "This house believes that unhealthy food should be more expensive than healthy food." Despite they only reached the second place in the competition, they were homaged by mayor of Pichilemu Roberto Córdova Carreño, and the Provincial Education Director, Abelardo Sepúlveda Vargas, in a ceremony held at the school on 26 October of that year.

The team reached fourth place in the 2012 regional finals, losing against Liceo Bicentenario Óscar Castro Zúñiga. The topic in the regional finals was "This house believes that social media should be censored."

The  English debate team participated once again in 2013. They passed to the Ministry of Education's English Debate Tournament regional finals with 173.5 points, the highest score of any of the Region of O'Higgins participant schools. The  team was closely followed by the teams of Instituto San Andrés from Rancagua (173 points), San Fernando College from San Fernando (172.5 points), and Liceo Bicentenario Óscar Castro Zúñiga, also from Rancagua (164.5 points). Kick-Ass, however, ultimately lost the regional finals against Colegio San Fernando College; this latter reached the second national place, in August 2013.

Their final participation in the Ministry's English Debate Tournament was in 2014. After obtaining the highest score in their region during a first round of debates, they ultimately obtained the third place in O'Higgins Region after discussing whether "[a]dvertisement aimed at children should be banned".

Olimpíadas de Actualidad

Preciosa Sangre participated again in the 2013 edition of the Olimpíadas de Actualidad. However, they did not make it to the second round, obtaining the 19th score (32 points) from 22 participating teams.

Other activities

With the support of the Governor of Cardenal Caro, Julio Ibarra, seven students represented  in the activity, in August 2011. The  team was led by history teacher Erna Pereira Arenas, and the students represented the country of Trinidad and Tobago. MOEA took place at the former National Congress in Santiago, and 32 other schools participated. According to Mother Loreto Fuentes Parra, principal of the school,  was one of the best three teams in the activity.

A team of second graders from  participated in the 2008 edition of a competition called  (Mining Marathon), organized by the Chilean Ministries of Mining and Education. The competition was a four-stage "marathon of knowledge".

In 2012, the same student earned an honorific mention for his tale "" (It's a Beautiful Day) from the Andrés Bello University's  (Interschool Contest of Spanish-language Tales). "" was published in a book commemorating the interschool contest of that year.

In October 2012, a group of eleventh and twelfth grade Preciosa Sangre students, led by history teacher Erna Pereira Arenas, organized a debate between candidates for mayor of Pichilemu, which was held on the 23 of that month, just five days before the election took place. Candidates Mario Moraga Cáceres (independent), Washington Araneda Carrasco (Progressist Party), Cristián Tamayo Latapiat (independent), and Carlos Acuña Arévalo (National Renewal) participated. According to Jorge Nasser Guerra from Radio Entreolas, and an article published on Diario VI Región, Roberto Córdova Carreño, who was eventually elected, rejected to participate in the debate because he "would not attend that kind of events", while Iván Cabrera Martínez "never responded the students' invitation". Some of the issues discussed in the debate were "municipal and higher education, health, urbanization, municipal corruption," amid other topics. The debate was broadcast live on local radio stations  and  FM. The debate was praised by local online newspaper Pichilemu News for being "the first ever debate held in Pichilemu" and "whose planification took care of every detail".

Every year, Preciosa Sangre celebrates its anniversary in October or November, with activities and games during two days; those include basketball, football, and Chilean games. The school is divided in two groups or alliances; in 2011, there was a red and a white alliance. The celebrations conclude with the presentation of carnival floats created by every alliance, and a gala party. During the 2012 celebrations, both alliances recorded a parody of the "Gangnam Style" music video by South Korean entertainer PSY; since the videos were uploaded to YouTube, the red alliance video reached almost 4,000 views as of February 2013, while in contrast, the white alliance video has only reached 1,800 in the same time span.

Notable alumni

Among former students of the Colegio de la Preciosa Sangre de Pichilemu are Jorge Vargas González (born 1966), a local politician who served as councilor of Pichilemu between 1992 and 1996, and later as mayor of the commune, between 1996 and 2007; and Rebeca Cofré Calderón (born 1962), current mayor of Chépica, in Colchagua Province, who initially took office in December 2008 and was re-elected in 2012 to a second term.

Notes

References

External links
 Official website 
 2011–12 website 
 Official Facebook page
 
 
 

1947 establishments in Chile
Buildings and structures in Pichilemu
Education in Pichilemu
Educational institutions established in 1947
Organizations based in Pichilemu
Catholic schools in Chile
School buildings completed in 1995
Schools in Cardenal Caro Province
Girls' schools in Chile